Fumigaclavine C is an ergoline alkaloid produced by Aspergillus fumigatus.

Both 8α and 8β diastereomers (epimers) were named fumigaclavine C in scientific literature.

See also
 9-Deacetoxyfumigaclavine C
 Fumigaclavine A
 Fumigaclavine B
 Fumigaclavine A dimethylallyltransferase
 Desformylflustrabromine

References

Ergolines
Acetate esters